Praeparasitus is a genus of mites in the family Laelapidae.

Species
 Praeparasitus collaris (Berlese, 1916)

References

Laelapidae